The Pietermaritzburg tramway network formed part of the public transport system in Pietermaritzburg, South Africa, for just over 32 years in the first half of the 20th century.

History

See also

List of town tramway systems in Africa
Rail transport in South Africa

References

External links

Passenger rail transport in South Africa
Pietermaritzburg
Pietermaritzburg
Transport in KwaZulu-Natal
Pietermaritzburg